A kwoon is a training hall for Chinese martial arts.

According to A Chinese-English Dictionary (Revised Edition) 1978, from Foreign Language Teaching and Research Press (PRC), the word guǎn can also mean

1)  Accommodation for guests;
2)  Embassy, legation or consulate;
3)  (Of service trades) shop;
4)  A place for cultural activities;
5)  (Archaic) An old-style private school

The website MDBG English to Chinese Dictionary also defines the word guǎn as meaning building, shop, service establishment, embassy or consulate, and also includes school as an old meaning for the word.

In Cantonese, the term kwoon is used when referring to:
 Police Stations - Chaai Kwoon
 Mahjong Houses - Ma Jeuk Kwoon
 Kung Fu Studios - Gung Fu Kwoon
 Guild Halls - Wui Kwoon

See also 
 Sifu
 Dojo

References 

Chinese martial arts terminology
Cantonese words and phrases